was a village located in Hiraka District, Akita Prefecture, Japan.

In 2003, the village had an estimated population of 4,364 and a density of 21.22 persons per km². The total area was 205.68 km².

On October 1, 2005, Sannai, along with the towns of Hiraka, Jūmonji, Masuda, Omonogawa and Ōmori; and the village of Taiyū (all from Hiraka District), was merged into the expanded city of Yokote.

External links
 Yokote official website 

Dissolved municipalities of Akita Prefecture
Yokote, Akita